Gypsonoma bifasciata is a species of moth of the family Tortricidae. It is found in China, Korea, Japan and Russia.

The wingspan is 9–13 mm.

The larvae feed on Salix species.

References

Moths described in 1966
Eucosmini